"Invasion of the Bane" is the first episode of the British science fiction television series The Sarah Jane Adventures. It was written by series creator Russell T Davies with Gareth Roberts and was directed by Colin Teague. It was originally broadcast on BBC One on 1 January 2007 as a New Year special. Since a full series of the show was commissioned before the script for the episode was written it is not a pilot, despite serving the introductory functions of one.

The episode focuses upon a teenage girl, Maria Jackson, discovering the existence of aliens which intend to conquer Earth using a mind-altering soft drink. She teams up with investigative journalist Sarah Jane Smith, a former travelling companion of the Doctor in Doctor Who, to prevent their plans.

Plot
Maria Jackson, and her recently divorced father Alan move into a house opposite journalist and former time traveller, Sarah Jane Smith. The night after she moves in, Maria is woken by Sarah Jane conversing with a star poet from Arcateen V.

The next morning, Maria is invited by her neighbour Kelsey Hooper to tour the factory of the soft drink Bubble Shock via a free tour bus. At the factory, a security scanner, surreptitiously collects the DNA of the visitors to be transferred to an artificially created human boy called the "Archetype". The Archetype is designed to study the two percent of humanity that is unaffected by the effects of Bubble Shock. Sarah Jane follows them to the factory, and suggests to Mrs Wormwood, the factory's owner, that Bane, an ingredient unique to the drink, came from outer space. On her way out Sarah Jane escapes from trying to be killed by Mrs Wormwood's secretary. Maria attempts to phone Kelsey, but sets off the alarms, waking the Archetype, transferring the focus upon him. Maria, the Archetype, and Sarah Jane escape out of a window in the women's toilet. The factory's PR representative Davey escorts Kelsey to Sarah Jane's street. Davey transforms into a squid-like form and pursues Sarah Jane into her house, but is repelled.

When Kelsey storms into Sarah Jane's attic, Sarah Jane admits that she finds aliens and prevents hostile incursions, but in a less "guns blazing" manner than what secret organisations do. After she reunited with the Doctor, Sarah Jane continued doing what she did when she and the Doctor travelled in space and time together. Once Sarah Jane analyses the Bane ingredient is a sentient secretion of an alien called the Bane Mother she contacts Mrs Wormwood with her supercomputer, Mr Smith, and politely requests that she leaves Earth. Mrs Wormwood refuses, and retaliates against the human race, intending to have the Bane Mother turn humanity into more Bane.

Sarah Jane forces the Bubble Shock bus through a wall of the factory. Remembering that factory tour participants had to turn off their mobile phones, Maria activates hers, which causes distress to the Bane Mother. The Archetype uses the much more powerful alien communicator given to Sarah Jane by the star poet, which kills the Bane Mother, and blows up the factory. Mrs Wormwood escapes. Sarah Jane agrees to adopt the Archetype and calls him Luke.

Continuity
Mrs Wormwood reappears in the series 2 serial Enemy of the Bane.
When trying to find a name for Luke, Sarah Jane mentions Harry, referring to Harry Sullivan and Alastair, which is the first name of Brigadier Lethbridge-Stewart before deciding on Luke.

Production

Concept and writing
In 2005, Doctor Who head writer Russell T Davies had envisioned using a former companion of the Doctor to explore the role and eventual fate of the Doctor's companions. Elisabeth Sladen was convinced to reprise the role of the Doctor's former companion Sarah Jane in "School Reunion", an episode of the second series of the revived Doctor Who series. Meanwhile, CBBC proposed a spin-off to Davies about a teenage Doctor, which he denied in favour of a spin-off revolving around Sarah Jane. While surprised, Sladen agreed to sign on the project. However, the rights for K9 to appear in the series were not secured. To explain the non-appearance of K9, the production team gave him a cameo fixing a black hole inadvertently created in Switzerland.

The episode was written by Davies and Gareth Roberts. Roberts drew from several outside sources several parts of the plot, for example the allusion to the star of Wormwood from the Book of Revelation. Roberts also used the name of a beverage called "Bubbleshake" in his novel The Highest Science for inspiration for Bubble Shock!.

Broadcast and reception
The first scene of "Invasion of the Bane" to be shown was on 8 December 2006, during a BBC Breakfast interview with Sladen, and was released a day later on the interactive advent calendar on the Doctor Who microsite. The clip, lasting one minute in length, was of Sarah Jane's interview with Mrs Wormwood.

The episode's airing on BBC One gathered 2.9 million viewers, 15% of the audience share, of which 20% were under 16. While the film Chitty Chitty Bang Bang, which aired against "Invasion of the Bane" on ITV1, had a higher overall reach, "Invasion of the Bane" had a slightly higher number of viewers head-to-head. The episode's audience Appreciation Index was 77, the average score for an episode of a drama programme.

Novelisation

This was the first of eleven Sarah Jane Adventures serials to be adapted as a novel. Written by Terrance Dicks, the book was first published in Paperback on 1 November 2007.

Notes

References

External links

Sarah Jane Adventures homepage

Novelisation

2007 British television episodes
Television shows written by Russell T Davies
Films with screenplays by Gareth Roberts (writer)
The Sarah Jane Adventures episodes
British television series premieres
Fiction about mind control
New Year's television specials